Tommy Booth (born 9 November 1949) is an English former footballer who played in the Football League for Manchester City and Preston North End, and was capped four times for England at under-23 level.

Booth was born in Middleton, Lancashire. He began his career with Manchester City, signing amateur forms in 1965, turning professional in 1967, and making his Football League debut on 9 October 1968 in a 1–1 draw at home to Arsenal. He played in the centre of defence, winning FA Cup, European Cup Winners' Cup and two League Cup winners' medals. He played 382 times for City in the League between 1968 and 1981, scoring 25 goals. In September 1981 he moved to Preston North End for £30,000. At Deepdale he made 84 appearances between 1981 and 1984, scoring twice, before injury forced him to retire during the 1984–85 season. In February 1985 he was appointed as Preston manager; with the club in difficult financial circumstances, he resigned in January 1986.

Honours
Manchester City
 Football League First Division winner 1967-68
 FA Cup winner: 1969
 European Cup Winners Cup winner: 1970
 League Cup winner: 1970, 1976
 FA Charity Shield: 1972

References

External links
 
 Stats, photos and bio at Sporting Heroes

1949 births
Living people
People from Middleton, Greater Manchester
English footballers
England under-23 international footballers
Association football defenders
Manchester City F.C. players
Preston North End F.C. players
English Football League players
English football managers
Preston North End F.C. managers
FA Cup Final players